Rodney Ubbergen (born 6 April 1986) is a Dutch footballer who plays as a goalkeeper for DOVO. He is of Surinamese descent.

Career
Born in Amsterdam, Ubbergen has played for AFC, Ajax, AZ, RKC Waalwijk, RBC Roosendaal, Telstar, Cambuur and FC Oss.

After spending two seasons with Cambuur, he signed for FC Oss in August 2014, on an amateur basis.

References

1986 births
Living people
Dutch footballers
Dutch sportspeople of Surinamese descent
Footballers from Amsterdam
Amsterdamsche FC players
AFC Ajax players
AZ Alkmaar players
RKC Waalwijk players
RBC Roosendaal players
SC Telstar players
SC Cambuur players
TOP Oss players
Eerste Divisie players
Association football goalkeepers
VV DOVO players